Season 1891–92 was the 19th season of competitive football by Kilmarnock.

Overview
Kilmarnock were founder members of the Scottish Football Alliance and finished second in its inaugural season. They reached the second round of the Scottish Cup after a 6–1 win away to East Stirlingshire but were eliminated after a second replay by Scottish Football League side Rangers.

The defence of Kilmarnock's Ayrshire Cup win from the previous season began with convincing wins against Lanemark - 5–1 at Rugby Park - and Stewarton Cunninghame - 14–0 at Standalone Park. The run came to an end after a 4–3 home defeat to Annbank in the third round.

There was success in the Kilmarnock Merchants' Charity Cup as Kilmarnock lifted the trophy for the third time after defeating Kilmarnock Athletic 5–0 in the semi-final and Hurlford 2–1 in the final.

Scottish Alliance

Notes

League table

Scottish Cup

Ayrshire Cup

Kilmarnock Merchants' Charity Cup

References

1891–92
1891–92 in Scottish football
Scottish football clubs 1891–92 season